Francis Allston Channing, 1st Baron Channing (21 March 1841 – 20 February 1926), known as Sir Francis Channing, Bt, between 1906 and 1912, was an American-born British barrister, academic, and Liberal Party politician.

Background and education
Channing born in Cincinnati, Ohio, United States, the youngest child and only son of American parents, Reverend William Henry Channing (1810–1884) and Julia Maria Allen (died 1889). He was the great-grandson of the Honourable William Channing, Attorney General of Rhode Island, by Lucy Ellery, daughter of William Ellery, a signer of the United States Declaration of Independence. He was the great-nephew of Dr William Ellery Channing, Walter Channing and Edward Tyrrel Channing and a first cousin once removed of William Ellery Channing. He was naturalized as a British subject in 1883. He was educated at Exeter College, Oxford and subsequently became a fellow, lecturer and tutor in philosophy at University College, Oxford, and was called to the bar at Lincoln's Inn.

Political career
Channing was elected as Liberal Member of Parliament (MP) for East Northamptonshire at the 1885 general election, and held the seat until the December 1910 general election. From 1893 to 1896 he was a member of the Royal Commission on Agricultural Depression. He was made a Baronet, of Maiden Newton in the County of Dorset, on 3 December 1906, and on 9 July 1912 he was elevated to the peerage as Baron Channing of Wellingborough, in the County of Northampton. In 1918 he published Memories of Midland Politics, 1885-1910.

Family
Lord Channing of Wellingborough married Elizabeth Bryant on 21 July 1869. They had three daughters and one son, but only his eldest daughter, the Honourable Mary Channing (died 1940), survived infancy. Lady Channing of Wellingborough died at 40 Eaton Place, London, in August 1925. Lord Channing only survived her by seven months and died in Eastbourne, Sussex, in February 1926, aged 84. He was buried in Torquay. The baronetcy and barony died with him.

References

Attribution

External links 
 

1841 births
1926 deaths
Alumni of Exeter College, Oxford
Fellows of University College, Oxford
Liberal Party (UK) MPs for English constituencies
Channing of Wellingborough, Francis Channing, 1st Baron
UK MPs 1885–1886
UK MPs 1886–1892
UK MPs 1892–1895
UK MPs 1895–1900
UK MPs 1900–1906
UK MPs 1906–1910
UK MPs 1910
UK MPs who were granted peerages
Members of Lincoln's Inn
Barons created by George V